"The Gentle" is an epithet and a nickname which may refer to:

 Alfonso IV of Aragon (1299–1336), King of Aragon and Count of Barcelona
 Frederick II, Elector of Saxony (1412–1464), also Landgrave of Thuringia
 Queen Susan the Gentle, a fictional character in C. S. Lewis's The Chronicles of Narnia series
 Mensur Suljović (born 1972), Serbian-born Austrian darts player nicknamed "The Gentle"

See also
 Angelo Bruno (1910–1980), Sicilian-American crime boss also known as "the Gentle Don"
 Donald Cameron of Lochiel (c. 1695 or 1700–1748), known as "Gentle Lochiel", hereditary chief of Clan Cameron and supporter of Bonnie Prince Charlie

Lists of people by epithet